The Coast to Coast Athletic Conference (C2C; officially stylized as Coast-to-Coast Athletic Conference), formerly named Capital Athletic Conference (CAC), is an intercollegiate athletic conference affiliated with the NCAA's Division III. Member institutions are located throughout the United States in the states of California, Maryland, Michigan, New York, North Carolina, Virginia, and Wisconsin.

History

Formed in 1989 as Capital Athletic Conference (CAC), the charter members were The Catholic University of America, Gallaudet University, the University of Mary Washington, Marymount University, St. Mary's College of Maryland, and York College of Pennsylvania.

On May 26, 2020, it was announced that the American Collegiate Athletic Association would merge with the Capital Athletic Conference. All full ACAA members and an associate member joined the CAC in the 2020–21 school year; the announcement also stated that the expanded CAC planned to adopt a new name. The post-merger conference does not conduct regular-season competition in any sports; members establish their own schedules, with NCAA championship bids handed out in conference tournaments or championship meets, depending on the sport.

On November 18, 2020, the Capital Athletic Conference announced its rebranding as the "Coast to Coast Athletic Conference".

On March 17, 2021, Mills announced that it would end conferment degrees to become a research institution after the 2022-23 school year, thus dissolving their athletic programs. This was later revised to be acquired by Northeastern University to become Northeastern University at Mills College. Through this merger, Mills will transition to a co-ed university and would discontinue athletics after the 2021-22 season.

On January 11, 2022, the University of Wisconsin–Platteville joins the C2C as an associate member for men's soccer, starting in the 2022 fall season (2022-23 academic year).

On July 26, 2022, the C2C announced that it would form the Coastal Lacrosse Conference, a single sport, men's lacrosse conference, with the New Jersey Athletic Conference. The members would include Christopher Newport University, Salisbury University, and University of Mary Washington from the C2C and Kean University, Montclair State University, and Stockton University from the NJAC. Play will begin in the 2022-23 season.

On July 27, 2022, the C2C announced the addition of Warren Wilson College as a full member starting in the 2022-23 season.

Chronological timeline

 1989 – The Capital Athletic Conference (CAC) was founded. Charter members included The Catholic University of America, Gallaudet University, Mary Washington College (now the University of Mary Washington), Marymount University, St. Mary's College of Maryland, and York College of Pennsylvania, effective beginning in the 1989-90 academic year.
 1991 – Salisbury State University (now Salisbury University) joined the CAC in all sports, effective in the 1991-92 academic year.
 1993 – Goucher College joined the CAC in all sports, effective in the 1993-94 academic year.
 2005 – Catholic and Goucher announced they would be departing for the newly-formed Landmark Conference, effective after the 2006-07 academic year.
 2006 – Hood College and Villa Julie College (now Stevenson University) joined the CAC for some sports, effective in the 2006-07 academic year.
 2007 – Wesley College joined the CAC in all sports (along with Hood and Stevenson), effective in the 2007-08 academic year.
 2010 – Gallaudet left the CAC to join the North Eastern Athletic Conference (NEAC; now the United East Conference), effective after the 2009-10 academic year.
 2010 – Frostburg State University joined the CAC in all sports, effective in the 2010-11 academic year.
 2012 – Hood and Stevenson departed the CAC for the Middle Atlantic Conferences, effective June 1, 2012.
 2013 – Christopher Newport University, Penn State Harrisburg and Southern Virginia University joined the CAC in all sports, effective on June 1, 2013.
 2013 – William Paterson University and New Jersey City University joined the CAC as associate members for men's golf, effective in the 2014 spring season (2013-14 academic year).
 2016 – William Paterson departed from the CAC as an associate member for men's golf, effective after the 2016 spring season (2015-16 academic year).
 2018 – Marymount and Wesley departed the CAC for the newly-formed Atlantic East Conference (AEC), effective after the 2017-18 academic year.
 2018 – Babson College joined the CAC as an associate member for men's golf, effective in the 2019 spring season (2018-19 academic year).
 2019 – Frostburg State began the transition to the Division II for the 2019-20 academic year, thus departed the CAC to join the Mountain East Conference, effective after the 2018-19 academic year.
 2019 – Penn State Harrisburg departed the CAC to return to the NEAC, effective after the 2018-19 academic year.
 2019 – Carnegie Mellon University joined the CAC as an associate member for men's golf, effective in the 2020 spring season (2019-20 academic year).
 2020 – York departed the CAC to join the MAC, effective after the 2019-20 season.
 2020 – The CAC announced that it would absorb the American Collegiate Athletic Association (ACAA), effective beginning in the 2020-21 academic year. Therefore, all full members, the University of California, Santa Cruz, Finlandia University, Mills College (women's sports only), Mount Mary University (women's sports only), Pine Manor College, and Pratt Institute, and associate member, University of Wisconsin–Whitewater, of the ACAA joined in their respective memberships.
 2020 – The Capital Athletic Conference announced that it would rebrand as the Coast-to-Coast Athletic Conference (C2C).
 2020 – The conference dropped men's and women's swimming and golf as conference sports after the 2020-21 season, therefore, men's golf associates, Babson, Carnegie Mellon and New Jersey City departed.
 2021 – St. Mary's departed the C2C to join the United East Conference, effective after the 2020-21 academic year. St. Mary's rejoined as an associate member in men's and women's indoor and outdoor track & field.
 2021 – Southern Virginia departed the C2C to join the USA South Athletic Conference, effective after the 2020-21 academic year.
 2021 – Pine Manor was acquired by Boston College, thus dissolving their athletics programs, effective after the 2020-21 academic year.
 2022 – Mills left the C2C to become a research institution, thus dissolving their athletics programs, effective after the 2021-22 academic year.
 2022 – The University of Wisconsin–Platteville will join the C2C as an associate member for men's soccer, effective beginning in the 2022 fall season (2022-23 academic year).
 2022 – On July 26, The Coast to Coast Athletic Conference announced that it would form the Coastal Lacrosse Conference therefore the C2C will no longer sponsor men's lacrosse.
 2022 – Warren Wilson College joined the C2C as a full member, effective in the 2022-23 academic year.
 2023 – In March 2023, Finlandia University announced that it would close following the 2022-23 school year, thus departing the conference.

Member schools

Current members
The C2C currently has eight full members, half are public schools and another half are private schools:

Notes

Associate members
The C2C currently has three associate members, all of them are public schools:

Notes

Former members
The C2C had 13 former full members, all but three were private schools:

Notes

Former associate members
The C2C had four former associate members, half were public schools and another half are private schools:

Notes

Membership timeline

Sports
The C2C sponsors championships in the following sports:

Men's sponsored sports by school

Notes

Men's varsity sports not sponsored by the C2C that are played by C2C schools

Notes

Women's sponsored sports by school

Notes

Women's varsity sports not sponsored by C2C that are played by C2C schools

Notes

Current champions

The table below shows the current list of champions for the C2C/CAC championships.

References

External links